"When It's Over" is a song by American rock band Sugar Ray. It was released to all radio formats on May 7, 2001, as the lead single from their self-titled fourth album (2001). The song reached number six in New Zealand, number 13 on the US Billboard Hot 100, and number 32 on the UK Singles Chart.

Music video
"When It's Over" is a song about having feelings for a person after the end of a relationship in which there were repeated breakups before. The music video (directed by McG) features segments of each band member's fantasy about a music video for the song, ending with the band partying on the beach. Stan Frazier's portion is first and it's consisted of him destroying a set, on which they play. Murphey Karges' portion is next and it shows the band performing as an Irish punk rock group. DJ Homicide's portion shows the group entering a strip club. Rodney Sheppard's segment portrays his love of kung fu, as he fights Kareem Abdul-Jabbar as Bruce Lee in his yellow jumpsuit. Mark McGrath's segment is last and it has the band in the 1980s imitating Duran Duran's "Is There Something I Should Know?" music video, incorporating elements of "I Ran (So Far Away)" by A Flock of Seagulls and "Cars" by Gary Numan. Sugar Ray's mascot, the bulldog, is also shown at the end of the music video in a brief cameo. A scooter accident can be seen near the end of the video (right).

An alternate music video aired on Cartoon Network, directed by Mark Marek and Ric Heitzman, with the band members depicted as cartoon characters. Frazier was dressed as George Jetson from The Jetsons and playing golf, while McGrath was playing basketball. This video premiered on June 4, 2001.

Track listings
European and Australian CD single
 "When It's Over" (album version) – 3:40
 "Someday" (live acoustic) – 3:42
 "Every Morning" (live acoustic) – 3:16

German CD single
 "When It's Over" (album version) – 3:35
 "Every Morning" (live acoustic) – 3:16

Credits and personnel
Credits are lifted from the US promo CD liner notes.

Studios
 Recorded at Jim Henson Studios (Los Angeles, California, US)
 Mixed at Scream Studios (Los Angeles, California, US)

Personnel
 Stan Frazier – writing
 Rodney Sheppard – writing
 Mark McGrath – writing
 Craig Bullock – writing
 David Kahne – writing, production, programming, mixing
 David Leonard – mixing

Charts

Weekly charts

Year-end charts

Release history

References

2001 singles
2001 songs
Atlantic Records singles
Lava Records singles
Music videos directed by McG
Song recordings produced by David Kahne
Songs written by David Kahne
Sugar Ray songs